Christopher Belcher (born January 29, 1994 in Sayville, New York) is an American professional track and field sprinter who specializes in the 100 meters and the 200 meters.  While in college he competed for the Monroe Mustangs and then the North Carolina A&T Aggies. He is currently sponsored by Nike.

Biography

Early life
Raised in Sayville, New York, Belcher attended Sayville High School. He also won the Division 1  dash state championship race his junior year. Belcher also competed and won the high school  dash at the 2013 Millrose Games.

Amateur career

Following his success in 2016, Belcher then went on to defend his  and  titles at the 2017 MEAC Championships.

Professional career
At the event, Belcher ran his last amateur race in the semifinals. Deciding to forego his final year of NCAA eligibility, he signed a professional contract with Nike. In London he made it through the heats but was unable to advance through the semis.

Statistics
Information from World Athletics profile unless otherwise noted.

Personal bests

100 meters progression

200 meters progression

International championship results

National championship results

NCAA results from Track & Field Results Reporting System.

Notes

References

External links

 (North Carolina A&T)
 (Monroe)

1994 births
Living people
Track and field athletes from New York (state)
Sportspeople from Suffolk County, New York
People from Sayville, New York
American male sprinters
African-American male track and field athletes
North Carolina A&T State University alumni
North Carolina A&T Aggies men's track and field athletes
World Athletics Championships athletes for the United States
21st-century African-American sportspeople